The German Democrats was a political party in Austria.

History
The only election contested by the party was the 1919 Constitutional Assembly elections, in which it received 2.2% of the national vote and won three seats. The party did not contest the elections the following year.

References

Defunct political parties in Austria
Defunct liberal political parties in Austria